Lawrence Alexander "Laurie" McArthur (20 August 1930 – 3 March 1996) was an Australian politician.

He was born in Hamilton to small farmer Alexander McArthur and his wife Ruth. He attended Marist Brothers College in South Australia and Ballarat Teachers' College, becoming a schoolteacher. He worked in the public education system, and was a member of the Labor Party. In 1982 he was elected to the Victorian Legislative Council as the member for Nunawading, serving until his defeat in 1988. He died in 1996.

References

1930 births
1996 deaths
Members of the Victorian Legislative Council
Australian Labor Party members of the Parliament of Victoria
20th-century Australian politicians
People from Hamilton, Victoria